The Subprefecture of Pirituba-Jaraguá is one of 32 subprefectures of the city of São Paulo, Brazil.  It comprises three districts: Pirituba, São Domingos, and Jaraguá. The highest point of the municipality of São Paulo, Pico do Jaraguá, is located in this place. It's also where the roads connecting Campinas and the Central-West region of Brazil have the start point.

References

Subprefectures of São Paulo